The Lunar Orbiter 3 was a spacecraft launched by NASA in 1967 as part of the Lunar Orbiter Program. It was designed primarily to photograph areas of the lunar surface for confirmation of safe landing sites for the Surveyor and Apollo missions. It was also equipped to collect selenodetic, radiation intensity, and micrometeoroid impact data.

Mission summary
The spacecraft was placed in a cislunar trajectory and injected into an elliptical near-equatorial lunar orbit on February 8 at 21:54 UT. The spacecraft acquired photographic data from February 15 to 23, 1967, and readout occurred through March 2, 1967. The film advance mechanism showed erratic behavior during this period resulting in a decision to begin readout of the frames earlier than planned. The frames were read out successfully until March 4 when the film advance motor burned out, leaving about 25% of the frames on the takeup reel, unable to be read.

A total of 149 medium resolution and 477 high resolution frames were returned. Included was a frame of the Surveyor 1 landing site, permitting identification of the location of the spacecraft on the surface. Accurate data were acquired from all other experiments throughout the mission. The spacecraft was used for tracking purposes until it struck the lunar surface on command at 14.3 degrees N latitude, 97.7 degrees W longitude (selenographic coordinates) on October 9, 1967.

See also

 Lunar Orbiter Image Recovery Project
 Exploration of the Moon
 Lunar Orbiter 1
 Lunar Orbiter 2
 Lunar Orbiter 4
 Lunar Orbiter 5
 List of artificial objects on the Moon

References

3
Spacecraft launched in 1967
Spacecraft that orbited the Moon
Spacecraft that impacted the Moon
1967 on the Moon